Dogue may refer to:
Dogue de Bordeaux, a breed of dog
Dogue, Benin
Dogue, Virginia
Doeg people, also known as Dogue